Thrybergh is a civil parish in the Metropolitan Borough of Rotherham, South Yorkshire, England.  The parish contains four listed buildings that are recorded in the National Heritage List for England.  Of these, one is listed at Grade II*, the middle of the three grades, and the others are at Grade II, the lowest grade.  The parish contains the village of Thrybergh and the surrounding area.  The listed buildings consist of a church, a cross shaft in the churchyard, a large house later used as a golf clubhouse, and a range of farm buildings later used for other purposes.


Key

Buildings

References

Citations

Sources

 

Lists of listed buildings in South Yorkshire
Buildings and structures in the Metropolitan Borough of Rotherham